Sir Basil Henry Blackwell (29 May 18899 April 1984) was born in Oxford, England. He was the son of Benjamin Henry Blackwell (18491924), founder of Blackwell's bookshop in Oxford, which went on to become the Blackwell family's publishing and bookshop empire, located on Broad Street in central Oxford. The publishing arm is now part of Wiley-Blackwell.

He was educated at Magdalen College School, Oxford and Merton College, Oxford. He was the first person in his family to attend university.

He is remembered as the bookseller who helped break the infamous "Ring" who colluded to close off open competition in auctions, "taking bread from the mouths of the widows and orphans" of Oxford scholars.

In 1913, he began working with his father at Blackwell's. Upon his father's death in 1924, he took over the company and remained working there for decades.

He was made a Knight Bachelor in 1956 by Queen Elizabeth II, the only bookseller ever to receive that honour. In 1959, he was elected to an honorary Fellowship at Merton. In 1970 he was given the honorary Freedom of the City of Oxford. In 1979 he was awarded a Doctorate of Civil Law honoris causa at the Oxford Encaenia.

Blackwell was a prosecution witness in the 1966 private prosecution attempt to bar the book Last Exit to Brooklyn from UK publication.

References

1889 births
1984 deaths
English publishers (people)
People from Oxford
People educated at Magdalen College School, Oxford
Alumni of Merton College, Oxford
Knights Bachelor
20th-century English businesspeople
Presidents of the Classical Association